Edinburgh was a burgh constituency of the House of Commons of the Parliament of Great Britain from 1708 to 1801 and of the Parliament of the United Kingdom from 1801 until 1885.

Creation
The British parliamentary constituency was created in 1708 following the Acts of Union, 1707 and replaced the former Parliament of Scotland burgh constituency of Edinburgh.

History
The constituency elected one Member of Parliament (MP) by the first past the post system until  representation was increased to two members in 1832. It was abolished in 1885, being split into Edinburgh Central, Edinburgh South, Edinburgh East and Edinburgh West.

Boundaries

The boundaries of the constituency, as set out in the Representation of the People (Scotland) Act 1832, were-

"From a Point on the Road from Leith to Queensferry which is distant Four hundred Yards (measured along such Road) to the West of the Point at which the same meets the Inverleith Road at the House called Golden Acre, in a straight Line to the North-western Corner of the Enclosure of John Watsons Institution; thence in a straight Line to the Second Stone Bridge, marked No. 2, on the Union Canal; thence in a straight Line to the Point at which the Western Wall of the Enclosure of the Lunatic Asylum at Morningside meets the Jordan or Pow Burn; thence down the Jordan or Pow Burn to a Point which is distant One hundred and fifty Yards (measured along such Burn) below the Arch over the same on the Carlisle Road; thence in a straight Line to the Summit of Arthur's Seat, thence in a straight Line to the Point at which the Feeder enters the Western Side of Lochend Loch; thence in a straight Line to the Point at which Pilrig Street joins Leith Walk; thence along Pilrig Street and the Bonnington Road to the Point at which the latter meets the Road from Leith to Queensferry; thence along the Road from Leith to Queensferry to the Point first described."

Members of Parliament

MPs 1708–1832

MPs 1832–1885 

Under the Representation of the People Act 1832, Edinburgh's representation was increased to two members.

Election results

Elections in the 1880s

 Caused by Cowan's resignation.

 Caused by McLaren's appointment as Senator of the College of Justice and elevation to the peerage, becoming Lord McLaren.

 Caused by McLaren's resignation.

Elections in the 1870s

Elections in the 1860s

Elections in the 1850s

 Caused by Moncreiff's appointment as Lord Advocate

 Caused by Macaulay's resignation by accepting the office of Steward of the Manor of Hempholme

Elections in the 1840s

 Caused by Cowan's election in 1847 being declared void, due to him being disqualified for holding a government contract at the time of the election

 Caused by Macaulay's appointment as Paymaster-General

 Caused by Gibson-Craig's appointment as a Lord Commissioner of the Treasury

 Caused by Macaulay's appointment as Secretary at War

Elections in the 1830s

 Caused by Abercromby's elevation to the peerage, becoming 1st Baron Dunfermline

 Caused by Campbell's appointment as Attorney General for England and Wales

 Caused by Abercromby's appointment as Master of the Mint

 Caused by Jeffrey's appointment as a Senator of the College of Justice, and his elevation to Lord Jeffrey

 The Radical candidate, James Aytoun, withdrew in favour of Jeffrey and Abercromby

Elections in the 1820s

References

See also 
 Politics of Edinburgh

Historic parliamentary constituencies in Scotland (Westminster)
Constituencies of the Parliament of the United Kingdom established in 1708
Constituencies of the Parliament of the United Kingdom disestablished in 1885
Constituencies in Edinburgh